Kubiš, feminine Kubišová, is a Czech and Slovak surname, derived from the given name Kuba, which is a variant of Jakub. An alternative spelling is Kubis and a similar surname is Kubisz. The name may refer to:

 Heinrich Kubis (1888–1979), German flight attendant
 Jan Kubiš (1913–1942), Czech soldier
 Ján Kubiš (born 1952), Slovak diplomat
 Lukáš Kubiš (born 2000), Slovak racing cyclist
 Marta Kubišová (born 1942), Czech singer
 Pavel Kubiš (born 1985), Czech ice hockey player
 Sven Kubis (born 1975), German footballer
 Tom Kubis (born 1951), American musician

References

See also
 

Czech-language surnames
Slovak-language surnames